Liu Chaoyang (born 9 June 1999) is a Chinese footballer currently playing as a midfielder for Shaanxi Chang'an Athletic, on loan from Shandong Taishan.

Club career
Liu Chaoyang was promoted to the senior team of Shandong Luneng within the 2019 Chinese Super League season and would make his debut on 1 March 2019 in a league game against Beijing Renhe F.C. that ended in a 1-0 victory. To gain more playing time he was loaned out to second tier club Sichuan Longfor for the remainder of the season. After playing several further games for Shandong the following season, Liu was loaned out again, this time to top tier club Shijiazhuang Ever Bright. The 2021 league campaign saw Liu loaned out for the entire season to second tier club Chengdu Rongcheng where he was able to gain significantly more playing time within the team as he aided them to promotion to the top tier at the end of the season.

Career statistics

References

External links

1999 births
Living people
Chinese footballers
Association football midfielders
Chinese Super League players
China League One players
Shandong Taishan F.C. players
Sichuan Longfor F.C. players
Cangzhou Mighty Lions F.C. players